An intensive outpatient program (IOP), also known as an intensive outpatient treatment (IOT) program, is a structured non-residential psychological treatment program which addresses mental health disorders and substance use disorders (SUDs) that do not require detoxification through a combination of group-based psychotherapy, individual psychotherapy, family counseling, educational groups, and strategies for encouraging motivation and engagement in treatment. IOP operates on a small scale and does not require the intensive residential or partial day services typically offered by the larger, more comprehensive treatment facilities.

The typical IOP program offers group therapy and generally facilitates 6-30 hours a week of programming for addiction treatment. IOP allows the individual to be able to participate in their daily affairs, such as work, and then participate in treatment at an appropriate facility in the morning or at the end of the day. With an IOP, classes, sessions, meetings, and workshops are scheduled throughout the day, and individuals are expected to adhere to the strict structure of the program. Online IOP has been shown to be effective as well. 

The typical IOP program encourages active participation in 12-step programs in addition to IOP participation. IOP can be more effective than individual therapy for chemical dependency.

IOP is also used by some HMOs as transitional treatment for patients just released from treatment in a psychiatric hospital or upon discharge from a residential treatment program.

See also 
 Partial hospitalization (PHP)

References 

Treatment of mental disorders
Addiction psychiatry